The Whole Thing's Started is the second studio album by British/Australian soft rock band Air Supply, it was released in July 1977. The first single "Do What You Do" was released ahead of the album in June, "That's How the Whole Thing Started" followed in October and "Do It Again" appeared in February 1978. Neither the album nor the singles peaked into the Australian Kent Music Report Top 40 charts.

Background
The Whole Thing's Started was produced by Peter Dawkins, and was released in July 1977 with Brenton White replaced on lead guitar by Rex Goh. The album spawned the singles "Do What You Do" (June), "That's How the Whole Thing Started" (October) and "Do It Again" (February 1978) but neither album nor singles charted into the top 40. From late 1977, the group supported Rod Stewart during his tour of Australia—he invited them to continue on to the United States and Canada. Their third album, Love & Other Bruises, included re-recordings of some earlier tracks, and was made mid-tour in Los Angeles in July–August and released internationally later that year on Columbia Records with Jimmy Horowitz producing. During the tour, Paul left the band with a new line-up of Goh, Hitchcock, Macara and Russell, plus Joey Carbone on keyboards, Robin LeMesurier on lead guitar and Howard Sukimoto on bass guitar. Paul, in 1980, joined fellow Air Supply bandmate McEntee in the lineup of Divinyls, fronted by Chrissie Amphlett. Air Supply performed in London supporting Chicago and Boz Scaggs.

Track listing

Personnel 
Air Supply members
 Russell Hitchcock – vocals
 Rex Goh – electric guitar
 Graham Russell – acoustic guitar, vocals
 Adrian Scott – keyboards
 Jeremy Paul – bass guitar, vocals
 Nigel Macara  – drums

Additional musicians
 William Motzing – arranger and conductor (strings and brass)

Recording details
 Producer – Peter Dawkins
 Engineer – Bruce Brown at Albert Studios, Sydney
 Additional Engineering – Peter Dawkins and Wyn Wynyard

Artwork
 Art Direction and Design – J. Peter Thoeming
 Photography – Patrick Jones

Charts

Release history

References

1977 albums
Air Supply albums
CBS Records albums
Albums produced by Peter Dawkins (musician)